Nimet Baş (previously Çubukçu) (born 2 March 1965) is a Turkish politician and lawyer. She has been the Member of Parliament from the Justice and Development Party since 2002. She was the Minister of State (2005–2009) and the Minister of National Education (2009–2011).

Baş was married to Birol Çubukçu. They divorced in 2011.

References 

1965 births
Living people
Justice and Development Party (Turkey) politicians
Ministers of National Education of Turkey
Istanbul University alumni
Istanbul University Faculty of Law alumni
Women government ministers of Turkey
Government ministers of Turkey
Deputies of Istanbul
Members of the 24th Parliament of Turkey
Members of the 23rd Parliament of Turkey
Members of the 22nd Parliament of Turkey
21st-century Turkish women politicians
21st-century Turkish politicians
Ministers of State of Turkey
Members of the 60th government of Turkey
People from Karaman Province